Abu al-Razi Muhammad ibn Abd al-Hamid (died 829) was a ninth century governor of the Yemen for the Abbasid Caliphate.

Career 
A mawla of the caliph al-Ma'mun (r. 813–833), Abu al-Razi was made deputy governor of Basra on behalf of Salih ibn al-Rashid in ca. 819, following the return of the caliph from Khurasan to Baghdad. In ca. 828 he was appointed by al-Ma'mun as governor of the Yemen, and he led an army to the province to deal with the rebel Ahmar al-'Ayn. Upon his arrival in Sana'a he received a request from the rebel for amnesty, which was initially granted, but he subsequently decided to arrest Ahmar al-'Ayn and send him in irons to the caliph in Baghdad.

Shortly after dealing with Ahmar al-'Ayn, Abu al-Razi was faced with another rebellion in the southern highlands of the country, by the Himyarite Ibrahim ibn Abi Ja'far al-Manakhi. The governor decided to advance against Ibrahim and attack him, but in the resulting engagement he was defeated and killed. Following Abu al-Razi's death, Ibrahim proceeded to plunder al-Janad, while Ishaq ibn al-Abbas ibn Muhammad al-Hashimi was selected as the new governor.

Notes

References 
 
 
 
 
 

829 deaths
9th-century people from the Abbasid Caliphate
9th-century Arabs
Abbasid governors of Yemen
9th century in Yemen